The Mutya ng Pilipinas beauty pageant has produced
 Five Miss Asia Pacific titles: Maria del Carmen Ines Zaragoza in 1982, Gloria Dimayacyac in 1983, Lorna Legaspi in 1989, Michelle Aldana in 1993, and Sharifa Akeel in 2018.
 Five Miss Tourism International titles: Maria Esperanza Corazon Manzano in  2000–2001, Rizzini Alexis Gomez in  2012–2013, Angeli Dione Gomez in 2013–2014, Jannie Loudette Alipo-on in 2017–2018, and Cyrille Payumo in 2019-2020
Three Miss Tourism Queen of the Year International titles: Sherylle Lynne Santarin in 1996, Racquel Uy in 1999, and Leren Mae Bautista in  2015.
 One Miss Tourism Cosmopolitan International: Barbara Salvador in 2010.
 One Miss Tourism Metropolitan International: Glennifer Perido in 2014.
 One Beauty of the World title: April Love Jordan in 2009.
One Dream Girl of the year International :Julieane "Aya" Fernandez in 2018

From 1977–1991 Mutya ng Pilipinas Asia and Mutya ng Pilipinas World competed in 2 international beauty pageants such as Miss Asia Pacific International and Miss World. The runners-up compete in Miss Wonderland International, Miss Tourism International, Miss Intercontinental, Queen of Clubs International, Queen of the Year and Miss Expo International.

One of the titles of Mutya ng Pilipinas, which was first named Mutya ng Pilipinas Asia has undergone name changes starting from 1965 until 1983 for the Miss Asia Quest. Then it was renamed Mutya ng Pilipinas Asia Pacific for Miss Asia Pacific Quest from 1984 until 2004. In 2005, the title was renamed once again to Mutya ng Pilipinas Asia Pacific International for Miss Asia Pacific International Quest. Then in 2006, the Miss Asia Pacific International pageant was completely & officially scrapped with the national titlist nowhere to compete internationally and was retained for 3 years. The winner in 2006 was sent to Miss Intercontinental and in 2007 to Miss Tourism Metropolitan International.

The Mutya organizers finally changed the title to Mutya ng Pilipinas International in 2008 as the top winner and the second winner as Mutya ng Pilipinas Tourism. In 2010, the top prize received the title of Mutya ng Pilipinas Tourism International and the co-winners with the titles of Mutya ng Pilipinas Intercontinental & Asia Pacific International.

In 2014, Miss Intercontinental Philippines delegates are no longer selected by Mutya ng Pilipinas Organization.

In 2018, the primary winners of the pageant namely Mutya ng Pilipinas Asia Pacific International, Mutya ng Pilipinas Tourism International, Mutya ng Pilipinas Tourism Queen of the Year International, and Mutya ng Pilipinas Global Beauty Queen.

In 2019 (on its 51st year), the franchise and leadership was handed over to Cory Quirino who is now the President of re-branded Mutya Pilipinas, Inc. and Fred Yuson as the Chairman of the Mutya ng Pilipinas, Inc. See Philippines at Pageantry.

After two-year hiatus (2020 and 2021) due to COVID 19 pandemic, on July 27th 2022, a press conference was held in BGC (Bonifacio Global City), Taguig with the organization reverting back to its former established name of Mutya ng Pilipinas. In its 52nd year, with the collaboration of the dynamic-duo of Cory Quirino and Fred Yuson, a newly-conceptualized international pageant is to emerge later this year titled Miss Mutya International. This pageant will objectify the vast culture and heritage of the Philippines which will be conveyed to the rest of the world in its inauguration in 2023 and in its ensuing years. Furthermore, the Mutya ng Pilipinas Organization and its global pageant elaborated its core principles and mantra of inclusivity and sustainability.

(Mutya (n.) means or synomous to 1. jewel; 2. pearl; 3. charm; 4. darling; 5. amulet.)

The current national winner, Iona Violeta Abrera Gibbs, was crowned as Mutya ng Pilipinas on December 4th, 2022. She will be the Philippines' flag-bearer at the first Miss Mutya International pageant to be held at undisclosed date.

Titleholders

  Color keys

1968–1976

1977–1981

1982

1983

1984–1985

1986

1987

1988

1989–1990

1991

1993

1994–1995

1996–1999

2000–2004

2005

2006–2007

2008

2009

2010

2011

2012

2013–2016

2017

2018

2019

2022 - present
Mutya ng Pilipinas Pageant 2022 and 2023 editions conjoined with finals held the 4th of December, 2022 with all major winners competing for 2023.

Current titles

Mutya ng Pilipinas – for Miss Mutya International (Miss Mutya of the World)(translated as Miss Jewel International or Miss Pearl International/ Miss Jewel of the World or Miss Pearl of the World)

(Mutya (n.) means or synomous to 1. jewel; 2. pearl; 3. darling; 4. charm; 5. amulet.)

This will be the launching of the newest international pageant christened as Miss Mutya International with its concept closely-analogous to the erstwhile Miss Maja International (held in Spain) which was later renamed to Miss Maja del Mundo (Miss Maja of the World) until its last episode in 1995. Maja (fem.) for nice girl in Spanish was distinguished in Madrid back in 18th century were the Maja wore elaborate traditional Spanish dresses/outfits. The Maja was the frequent subject of painter Francisco Goya and became one of the popular and informal symbols of Spain. Miss Mutya International (translated as Miss Jewel International or Miss Pearl International) will showcase the Philippines' tourism, costumes, customs, culture, and traditions to the rest of the world. 

Color key

Mutya ng Pilipinas – Intercontinental 
Top winners or appointed representatives were sent to the Miss Intercontinental Pageant.

Color key

Note:
 Jamie Fermin Burgos – competed Miss Intercontinental 2004 and ended as one of the Top 12 Semi-Finalist.
 Kathleen Anne Loyola Po – represented Philippines to the Miss Intercontinental 2011 pageant because of the delay in the local pageant schedule. She was Miss Philippines Intercontinental and Miss Pearl of the Philippines USA 2011.
 The years 2002, 2003, 2007, & 2008, the title was not awarded or the Philippines was not represented.

Mutya ng Pilipinas – Asia Pacific International

formerly Miss Asia and Miss Asia Pacific Quest

(Also called Mutya ng Pilipinas Intercontinental or Mutya ng Pilipinas Asia Pacific or Mutya ng Pilipinas Asia Pacific Int'l or Mutya ng Pilipinas International. The titles given annually by the organizers of Mutya ng Pilipinas, Inc. have undergone multiple name changing).

Winners were sent to the revamped Miss Asia Pacific International Pageant until 2005.

The international pageant was discontinued in 2006 but Mutya ng Pilipinas, Inc. continued to crown the Mutya ng Pilipinas Asia Pacific title up to 2013 even if the international pageant was defunct back in 2006.

The winner were previously assigned to compete at Miss Intercontinental Pageant and in some occasions Miss Tourism International started in 2006 until 2013. Miss Asia Pacific International pageant was revived once again and held in 2016 up to 2019. The COVID19 pandemic emerged in 2020 resulting in discontinuation of said pageant for three consecutive years and up to the present.

Color key

Mutya ng Pilipinas – World Top Model 

Color key

Mutya Pilipinas – Top Model of the World

Color key

Mutya ng Pilipinas – Tourism International
(Also called Mutya ng Pilipinas – Tourism or Mutya ng Pilipinas Tourism Puerto Princesa in 2008 and Mutya ng Pilipinas Tourism Aurora in 2009.)
Winners were delegated as Ambassadors of the Philippine Department of Tourism.)

From 1994, winners or appointed representatives were sent to the Miss Tourism International Pageant. *Note: From 1975 until 1991, the Mutya ng Pilipinas Tourism winners were not sent to any particular international pageant. The years 1982–1985, 1989, 1992 and 1993, no winners selected.

Color key

DNC/NIPH – Did Not Compete / No International Pageant Held.
N/A – Not Applicable

Mutya ng Pilipinas – Overseas Communities

Color key
This title is open only for eligible delegates from overseas Filipino communities.

Mutya ng Pilipinas – Tourism Queen of the Year International 

Mutya ng Pilipinas, Inc. sent Philippines' delegates to Miss Tourism Queen of the Year International.

Color key

Mutya ng Pilipinas – Global Beauty Queen 
Color key

Mutya ng Pilipinas – Top Model of the World 

Color key

Former titles

Mutya ng Pilipinas – World 
Replaced the Miss Republic of the Philippines from 1977 in sending delegates to the Miss World pageant until 1991.

Color key

Mutya ng Pilipinas – Queen of the Clubs International 

Color key

Mutya ng Pilipinas (Beauty of the World / Miss International Beauty & Model Festival) 

Mutya ng Pilipinas, Inc. sent Philippines' delegates to Miss Beauty of the World International.

Color key

Mutya ng Pilipinas – Tourism Universe 

Mutya ng Pilipinas, Inc. sent Philippines' delegates to Miss Tourism Universe 2001, Mutya ng Pilipinas First Runner-up, Michelle Ann Peñez competed at Miss Tourism Universe 2001 and placed First Runner-up.

Color key

Mutya ng Pilipinas – Wonderland 

Color key

Mutya ng Pilipinas – Charm 

The titleholder participated at Miss Charm International.
Color key

Mutya ng Pilipinas – Expo international 

The titleholder participated at Miss Charm International.
Color key

Mutya ng Pilipinas – Globe

The titleholder competed at Miss Globe International. 

Color key

Mutya ng Pilipinas – Trade (Special Title)

Other International pageants participated by former Mutya ng Pilipinas Contestants

Color key

References